Noel Durkin (born 25 December 1963) is an Irish former Gaelic footballer. His league and championship career at senior level with the Mayo county team spanned ten seasons from 1983 until 1993.

Career statistics

Honours
 Galway
 Connacht Senior Football Championship (5): 1985, 1988, 1989, 1992, 1993

References

1963 births
Living people
Ballaghaderreen Gaelic footballers
Gaelic football forwards
Mayo inter-county Gaelic footballers